Harold Ellis may refer to:

 Harold Ellis (basketball) (born 1970), American basketball player
 Harold Ellis (cricketer) (1883–1962), English cricketer
 Harold Ellis (surgeon) (born 1926), British surgeon

See also
Harry Ellis (disambiguation)